Graham Thompson (born 2 May 1964) is a Zimbabwean butterfly, freestyle and medley swimmer. He competed in four events at the 1988 Summer Olympics.

References

External links
 

1964 births
Living people
Zimbabwean male butterfly swimmers
Zimbabwean male freestyle swimmers
Zimbabwean male medley swimmers
Olympic swimmers of Zimbabwe
Swimmers at the 1988 Summer Olympics
African Games silver medalists for Zimbabwe
African Games bronze medalists for Zimbabwe
African Games medalists in swimming
Place of birth missing (living people)
Competitors at the 1987 All-Africa Games
Competitors at the 1991 All-Africa Games
21st-century Zimbabwean people
20th-century Zimbabwean people